Crab Run Lane Truss Bridge is a historic Truss bridge located on State Route 645 in McDowell, Highland County, Virginia. It was built in 1896, by the West Virginia Bridge Works of Wheeling, West Virginia. Much of the bridge is constructed of bent and straight steel railroad rails. The bridge was taken out of service for vehicular traffic in 1994; it is now used to carry pedestrian and bicycle traffic.

The bridge was listed on the National Register of Historic Places in 2009.

See also
List of bridges on the National Register of Historic Places in Virginia

References

Road bridges on the National Register of Historic Places in Virginia
Bridges completed in 1896
Buildings and structures in Highland County, Virginia
National Register of Historic Places in Highland County, Virginia
Truss bridges in the United States
Steel bridges in the United States
1896 establishments in Virginia